Nazar Chaqli (also Romanized as Naz̧ar Chāqlī and Naz̧ar Chāghlī) is a village in Nezamabad Rural District, in the Central District of Azadshahr County, Golestan Province, Iran. At the 2006 census, its population was 738, in 167 families.

References 

Populated places in Azadshahr County